Gee Broadcast Systems Ltd was founded in the UK in early 1987 by Keith and Sarah Gee. The company was initially set up to provide a design and installation service for broadcast Television systems but expanded to equipment sales and distribution, including videographics and "engineering" products. Later the 'Geevs' (Gee Video Server) family of video servers was developed and led to growth particularly in exports. Exports of Geevs have reached over 50 countries and formed the largest part of the Gee Broadcast business.

In 2004, Gee Broadcast acquired Lightworks in order to provide a tapeless production system with multichannel servers and editing systems.

In 2009, Gee Broadcast Systems Ltd went into administration, and was dissolved in November 2010. Prior to this, certain assets of the company were acquired by EditShare.

Geevs Server Systems
Geevs Servers can be built to meet the requirements of many different applications. Geevs can provide system design and consultancy or work with other system integrators for specific requirements.

Lightworks Editors
Lightworks Editors are used in many different areas including feature films, TV drama, soaps, commercials and sports. Lightworks is known for its console and user interface which together provide editing.

Tapeless Production Systems
Gee Broadcast Tapeless Production Systems were configured to match specific customers needs and can include Geevs servers and Lightworks Editors.

References

Film and video technology